Trailing Suction Hopper Dredger Congo River is the newest ship of the DEME fleet with the biggest hopper capacity: 30,190 m3. DEME N.V. signed a contract with IHC Dredgers B.V. for the design, construction, and delivery of the ship.

Launching 
The contract between DEME N.V. and IHC Dredgers B.V. was signed in December 2008. On 15 December 2009 the keel was laid, and on 8 July 2011 the ship was named during a formal ceremony in Zeebrugge.

Christening 
Justine Henin, the olympic tennis champion, has been designated to be the godmother of the Congo River. 
The christening took place on 8 July 2011 in Zeebrugge.

Main characteristics 
The main characteristics of the Congo River, construction year 2011.

The hopper can be equipped with the Dracula system with a power of 27,677 kW. The Dracula system is used for the dredging of cemented sand with an UCS-value of 5 to 8 MPas.

New contract 
The Congo River has been assigned to the Eko Atlantic city project in Nigeria.

References 

Ships of Belgium
2011 ships